Mark Henry Evans (born 2 January 1985) is a British musical theatre actor, singer, dancer and choreographer from Wales, known for numerous Welsh-language and English-language productions. His various theatre credits include Wicked and Ghost the Musical. Following an 18-month (Dec 2012 – June 2014) engagement in the North American national tour of The Book of Mormon, he is currently based in New York City.

Personal life 
Evans was born in St. Asaph, North Wales and raised on a farm in Llanrhaeadr in the county of Denbighshire. He is married to fellow actor Justin Mortelliti.

Career
Beginning performances on 16 July 2007, he joined the ensemble of the acclaimed London West End production of Wicked and served as the second understudy for Fiyero Tigelaar. He departed the cast on 7 June 2008, only to return over three and a half years later, this time, in the lead role of Fiyero. He starred alongside Rachel Tucker and Louise Dearman from 7 February through 10 December 2011, when he ended his run in the musical.

On 13 January 2012, took over the role of Sam Wheat in the London production of Ghost the Musical and starred alongside Siobhan Dillon until the musical closed on 6 October 2012. During his time in the show, he and Dillon released a single cover version of "Unchained Melody".

Some of Mark's theatre other credits included the UK national tours of High School Musical (Troy Bolton), The Rocky Horror Show (Brad) and Oklahoma! (Curly).

He appeared on the US national tour of The Book of Mormon in the lead role of Elder Price. Evans began performances on 28 December 2012 in San Francisco contracted for a six-month run, subsequently twice extended to summer 2014, after which he relocated to New York.

Another primary musical achievement of Mark's came when he appeared on Your Country Needs You with Andrew Lloyd Webber. Mark reached the final in this BBC television competition to determine the UK's competitor in the 2009 Eurovision Song Contest, which saw his talents broadcast to millions of people – he finished in third place. From here he developed on an emerging career in television, particularly in Welsh language broadcast. He has become a regular on S4C, appeared frequently as a presenter on whatsoninthetheatre.com and developed on such Welsh-language programs as "Dechrau Canu Dechrau Canmol", "Wedi 7", "The Eisteddfod Annual Concert", "The Sian Cothi Show", "Noson Lawen" and "The Big Welsh Talent Concert". His other television and film credits include his own special broadcasting produced by Boomerang Productions, "Noson yng Nghwmni Mark Evans", on S4C in March 2012. He played Brett in "Lake Placid 3" (2010) and also starred as Chad in Grain Media's "Dead Hungry". His venture on S4C, "Marcaroni", a children's program in which he stars in title role was well received by the public. Evans recently recorded a pilot for his own Radio programme for "BBC Radio Cymru".

The foundations of theatre are integral to Mark's constant development. As an individual rooted in the traditionalism on the stage, he also has a wide range of experience in theatrics, which includes both singing and dancing. In October 2011, he released a bi-lingual album on contemporary Welsh label, Sain Records, which was so well received that he re-released an English Deluxe edition in 2012.

In 2016, he is performing in a production of "Finian's Rainbow" at the Irish Repertory Theatre as the character, Og.

Having travelled the country acting and performing, Mark also gives something back to his community. The West End in Wales scheme is an initiative created by Mark in August 2006. This inspiring program offers children in North Wales the chance to work alongside Evans and current West End professionals in a week-long musical theatre summer school.

Professional Theatre credits

Recordings

The Journey Home | Adre'n Ôl
In September 2010, Mark began to write his debut album. He decided to make his album personal and almost autobiographical of the 10 years since he had left his home in Wales. "The Journey Home" was released on Sain Records in 2011. The 12-track album features guest vocalists including Ysgol Glanaethwy and former Wicked co-star Ashleigh Gray.

The Journey Home | Deluxe Edition
Mark released his debut album The Journey Home on Sain Records in 2011. A Deluxe version of the album was released in 2012 and translates all the Welsh songs into English, with bonus tracks in Welsh. The single, "Unchained Melody", made for Evans' and Dillon's turn in Ghost, was added to the album.

Professional Television/Screen Credits 
Television

Film

Dancing/Choreography

H&M clothing commercial, Playing Fred Astaire. European Christmas campaign.

Guest on TV shows

References

External links 
 markevansonline.co.uk

1985 births
21st-century Welsh male actors
21st-century Welsh male singers
Welsh gay musicians
Gay dancers
Gay singers
Welsh LGBT singers
Living people
People from St Asaph
Welsh gay actors
Welsh expatriates in the United States
Welsh male musical theatre actors
20th-century Welsh LGBT people
21st-century Welsh LGBT people